P117 may refer to:
 , a patrol boat of the Mexican Navy
 C19orf70, chromosome 19 open reading frame 70, a protein
 Papyrus 117, a biblical manuscript
 P117, a state regional road in Latvia